Alexandre Tagliani (born October 18, 1973), nicknamed "Tag", is a Canadian professional racing driver. He competes full-time in the NASCAR Pinty’s Series, driving the No. 18 Chevrolet Camaro for 22 Racing.

Tagliani has competed in a variety of disciplines including open-wheel, stock car, and sports car racing. He has raced in the Atlantic Championship, Champ Car, IndyCar Series, NASCAR Pinty's Series, and NASCAR Xfinity Series.

Racing career

Atlantic Championship
Tagliani debuted in the Atlantic Championship in 1996 with P-1 Racing, where he finished seventh in the overall points standings. Switching to Forsythe Racing, he finished third in 1997, fourth in 1998, and fourth in 1999, claiming two wins in each season.

Champ Car
Tagliani raced in the Champ Car series from 2000, when it was still known as CART, until its demise in 2007. He was signed by Forsythe Racing for the 2000 season replacing Greg Moore.

He came close to obtaining his first victory in his third start, after taking pole position at Brazil and leading most of the race, but spun out from the lead with nine laps to go.

In 2001, he was involved in the collision with Alex Zanardi at the Lausitzring that resulted in the loss of Zanardi's legs.

He remained at Forsythe until the end of 2002, when he was substituted by Paul Tracy. He found a job with the Rocketsports team in 2003, and remained there for the 2004 season, in which he earned his first and only Champ Car victory at Road America.

In 2005, he joined Team Australia, which was a rebranding of Derrick Walker's long-running team with the support of Australian businessman Craig Gore, and finished seventh in the championship despite lacking a race engineer. The seventh-place finish would equal the best of his three Top 10 championship points finishes.

He returned to Rocketsports for the 2007 season, and finished 10th in points with a best finish of fourth in the first race of the season. He earned four pole positions during his Champ Car career.

IndyCar
In 2008, after the Rocketsports team decided not to take part in the IndyCar Series, Tagliani made the transition to stock cars and began racing in the NASCAR Canadian Tire Series. He also drove for Conquest Racing in the IndyCar Series Detroit Grand Prix, replacing the injured Enrique Bernoldi.  Tagliani continued in the seat for the last two races of the season.

Conquest Racing announced that Tagliani would return as a full-time driver for the 2009 season. However, the team ultimately concentrated on road and street course races after the Indianapolis 500; ninth place in Toronto proved his best result. Tagliani left Conquest Racing after the 2009 Rexall Edmonton Indy race in Edmonton, Alberta, Canada.

It was announced on August 28, 2009, that Tagliani had signed a four-year deal with an option for a fifth year to drive for start-up FAZZT Race Team in the IZOD IndyCar Series beginning in 2010.

After a successful 2010 campaign with Tagliani, FAZZT Race Team was looking forward to an even more successful 2011 season, along with the possible expansion on the grid with a second entry. However, the team was purchased by Sam Schmidt on March 1, 2011, and was absorbed into Sam Schmidt Motorsports. Tagliani was retained, along with all sponsors, for a full-time entry during the 2011 season, racing alongside his new teammates Townsend Bell, Wade Cunningham, and Jay Howard.

In 2011, for the 100th anniversary of the first running of the Indianapolis 500, Tagliani qualified on the pole position with a four-lap average of 227.472 mph, besting Scott Dixon in the last run of the day. Unfortunately for Tagliani, he would run wide in turn 4 on lap 147 and make contact with the outside wall, inflicting damage upon the car which would force him to retire from the race the following lap.

To date, Tagliani's best finish in the Indianapolis 500 is tenth, which he achieved in 2010 while driving for FAZZT Race Team. His best performance was arguably the 2016 event when he charged hard from 33rd starting position to lead 11 laps, matching a record set by Tom Sneva in 1980.

NASCAR Xfinity and Truck Series

Tagliani has run selected races in the NASCAR Xfinity Series since 2009. That year he entered the Montreal and Phoenix rounds with Pat MacDonald. He drove at Montreal in 2011 for Team Penske and 2012 for Steve Turner. He did not enter any race in 2013.

In 2014, Tagliani announced that he would drive in two races in the series for Team Penske. At Road America for the Gardner Denver 200, Tagliani won the pole position driving Penske's No. 22. Tagliani nearly won his first NNS race leading the second half. However, it was questionable with 10 laps to go if Tagliani had enough fuel. A caution came out before the final lap and just as the yellow period began, Tagliani ran out of gas in the extended race and stalled at the start/finish line. Tagliani switched to dry (slick) tires with most of the field on wet tires (on a drying track); he restarted in 23rd place and recovered for second place. At  Mid-Ohio he finished fifth without leading any lap.

Later in 2014, Tagliani was announced as the driver for Brad Keselowski Racing's No. 19 in the Camping World Truck Series event at Canadian Tire Motorsport Park. Despite the race being his very first Truck Series start, he earned the pole position and led the first seven laps. However, he would finish the race in sixteenth.

In 2015, Tagliani drove one race for Team Penske in the Xfinity Series race at Mid-Ohio Sports Car Course. He earned the pole and was in contention for the victory, losing the lead in the second-to-final corner of the race after being hit by eventual winner Regan Smith. Two weeks later, Tagliani drove the No. 29 truck for Brad Keselowski Racing at Mosport, leading a total of 8 laps and finishing 5th after battling Erik Jones for the lead late in the race.

In 2016, Tagliani made a one-off appearance in the No. 22 for Team Penske at Road America in the Xfinity Series, and earned the pole for the race. He would lead 17 laps and score a seventh-place finish. Tagliani would part ways with Penske at year's end, to make way for other Penske drivers such as Austin Cindric.

Tagliani returned to the Truck Series for the 2017 Mosport race, driving the No. 02 for Young's Motorsports.

For the 2019 Chevrolet Silverado 250, he moved to Kyle Busch Motorsports' No. 51 Toyota. He returned to the team in August 2020 at the Daytona International Speedway road course.

NASCAR Pinty's Series
In 2007, Tagliani debuted in the NASCAR Canadian Tire Series, entering two rounds with Dave Jacombs. In 2008, he raced in 9 out of 13 races with that team, scoring a win at Edmonton Airport.

Tagliani competed at two NASCAR Canada Series races in 2009, two in 2013 and one in 2013. He scored four pole positions, but his best finishes were fifth.

The driver returned as a full-time driver in 2014 with his own team. Again, his best results were fifth, and ended ninth in the overall standings. In 2015, he joined Colin Livingston's team, where he claimed his second win at Sunset and two third-place finishes. In 2016, he scored three wins at Sunset, Toronto and Edmonton International Raceway, and finished third in points.

Tagliani joined Scott Steckly's 22 Racing team in 2017. In 2018, he finished second in the standings behind Louis-Philippe Dumoulin. During the 2019 season, he scored a win at Toronto and was running in points until myocarditis forced him out of competing in the Autodrome St. Eustache round, effectively ending his championship hopes.

Sports cars
Tagliani has competed in sports cars since the mid-2000s. He finished 59th in GRAND-AM Rolex Sports Car Series GT class points in 2007, with a best finish of 13th at Autodromo Hermanos Rodriguez in Mexico City. In 2013, he drove driving a Ferrari GRAND-AM GT in the Rolex Sports Car Series. Later, Rocketsports Racing announced that it had signed Tagliani for the full 2014 United SportsCar Championship season to drive an Oreca FLM09.

Personal life
Tagliani has severe food allergies and suffered several episodes of anaphylaxis. He has promoted public awareness through the Food Allergy Canada and personal sponsor Pfizer.

Motorsports career results

Career summary

American open-wheel racing results
(key)

CART/Champ Car

 ^ New points system implemented in 2004

IndyCar Series

 1 Run on same day.
 2 Non-points-paying, exhibition race.
 3 The Las Vegas Indy 300 was abandoned after Dan Wheldon died from injuries sustained in a 15-car crash on lap 11.

 ** Podium (Non-win) indicates 2nd or 3rd place finishes.
 *** Top 10s (Non-podium) indicates 4th through 10th place finishes.

Indianapolis 500

NASCAR
(key) (Bold – Pole position awarded by qualifying time. Italics – Pole position earned by points standings or practice time. * – Most laps led.)

Xfinity Series

Gander RV & Outdoors Truck Series

Pinty's Series

 Season still in progress
 Ineligible for series points

Touring/sports car racing 
(Races in bold indicate pole position)

V8 Supercar results 

+ International driver, not eligible for points in 2010 format.  Points listed is team points for driver Jason Bargwanna in the two races where Tagliani was co-driver for the #11 Kelly Racing Holden.

See also
List of Canadians in Champ Car

References

External links

Alex Tagliani at Driver Database

Living people
1973 births
People from Terrebonne, Quebec
Racing drivers from Quebec
Indianapolis 500 drivers
Indianapolis 500 Rookies of the Year
Indianapolis 500 polesitters
IndyCar Series drivers
Champ Car drivers
Atlantic Championship drivers
NASCAR drivers
Supercars Championship drivers
Rolex Sports Car Series drivers
IndyCar Series team owners
Canadian people of Italian descent
Francophone Quebec people
Sportspeople from Montreal
24 Hours of Daytona drivers
WeatherTech SportsCar Championship drivers
Chip Ganassi Racing drivers
Team Penske drivers
Sarah Fisher Racing drivers
A. J. Foyt Enterprises drivers
Kyle Busch Motorsports drivers
Conquest Racing drivers
Walker Racing drivers
Arrow McLaren SP drivers
Bryan Herta Autosport drivers
Rocketsports Racing drivers
Forsythe Racing drivers
RuSPORT drivers
Starworks Motorsport drivers
Kelly Racing drivers
24H Series drivers